Cléber Verde Cordeiro Mendes (born 10 May 1972) more commonly known as Cléber Verde is a Brazilian politician. He has spent his political career representing Maranhão, having served as state representative since 2007.

Personal life
Verde is the son of Jesuino Cordeiro Mendes and Maria da Graça Cordeiro Mendes. Aside from being a politician Verde has worked as a college professor, lawyer, writer, and civil servant. Verde is a member of the Assembleias de Deus, one of the few members of the church in the IURD dominated republican party.

Political career
After having represented mostly left-wing parties throughout his political career, Verde joined the religious right-wing Brazilian Republican Party in 2007.

Verde voted in favor of the impeachment of then-president Dilma Rousseff. Verde voted in favor of the 2017 Brazilian labor reform, and would vote against a corruption investigation into Rousseff's successor Michel Temer.

References

1972 births
Living people
Brazilian educators
20th-century Brazilian lawyers
Brazilian Pentecostals
Members of the Chamber of Deputies (Brazil) from Maranhão
Members of the Legislative Assembly of Maranhão
People from Maranhão
Republicans (Brazil) politicians
Brazilian Labour Party (current) politicians
Green Party (Brazil) politicians
Workers' Party (Brazil) politicians